Put is a Croatian pop group from Rijeka.

It was selected from members of Putokazi, in order to appear at 1993 Eurovision Song Contest as the very first representative of independent Croatia, singing "Don't Ever Cry". The members of the group were Vivien Galletta, Angela Jeličić, Melita Sedić, Naim Ajra, Petar Cucak Migliaccio and Olja Desic.

Eurovision Song Contest entrants for Croatia
Eurovision Song Contest entrants of 1993
Croatian pop music groups
Culture in Rijeka